Rabah Gamouh (born 21 October 1952) is an Algerian former professional footballer who played as a midfielder and forward.

International career
Gamouh was a member of the Algeria national team that qualified for the 1982 FIFA World Cup, playing in the decisive final qualifiers against Nigeria. However, he was not selected in the squad for the final tournament.

Honours
 Algerian Championnat National top scorer: 1970–71 (25 goals), 1971–72 (24 goals)

References

1952 births
Living people
People from Annaba
Algerian footballers
Association football midfielders
Association football forwards
Algeria international footballers
African Games competitors for Algeria
Footballers at the 1973 All-Africa Games
Nîmes Olympique players
Grenoble Foot 38 players
En Avant Guingamp players
La Roche VF players
Ligue 1 players
Ligue 2 players
Algerian expatriate footballers
Expatriate footballers in France
Algerian expatriate sportspeople in France
21st-century Algerian people